Rocco "Roberto" Boscaglia (born 24 May 1968 in Gela) is an Italian football coach and former midfielder. He was most recently the head coach of Foggia.

Career
A former amateur midfielder, Boscaglia took his first head coaching role in 2004 at the helm of Eccellenza club Akragas, obtaining a seventh and a second place in two seasons in charge. In 2006, he then took over from another Sicilian Eccellenza club, Alcamo, leading them to promotion to Serie D. This was then followed by two seasons at Nissa, which he led to Serie D promotion as well (in a personal second consecutive Eccellenza title) followed by a surprising third place in the top amateur flight.

Boscaglia's impressive results at Nissa led to interests from ambitious Serie D club Trapani, owned by navigation entrepreneur Vittorio Morace who offered him the vacant coaching role at his club with the goal to bring the Granata back into professionalism. In his first season in charge, Boscaglia guided Trapani into second place behind Milazzo; however the club was successively admitted into Lega Pro Seconda Divisione later that season to fill a vacancy in the league.

In his first taste of professional football, Boscaglia led Trapani to another second place, then defeating Avellino in the promotion play-off final to ensure his club a second consecutive promotion.

In the 2011–12 season, Trapani - now in the Italian third tier, Lega Pro Prima Divisione - surprisingly emerged as contenders for a third consecutive promotion, missing out at the last weekday to Spezia Calcio and then losing to Virtus Lanciano in the playoff finals. However, promotion was only delayed by one season as Boscaglia surprisingly led Trapani to a championship title the following year against the likes of Lecce, who were unanimously tipped as title favourites, and ensured a historical first Serie B campaign ever to the Sicilian minnows. As head coach of a newly promoted Serie B club, he was therefore successfully admitted to the yearly UEFA Pro Licence course to be held in Coverciano.

Boscaglia was dismissed as head coach of Trapani on 10 March 2015, after six years in charge, due to poor results; his role was taken over by Serse Cosmi.

For the 2015–16 season, Boscaglia was named head coach of Brescia. He left Brescia in June 2016 to accept an offer from another Serie B club, Novara.

On 3 June 2017, after completing a full season in charge of Novara, he agreed upon returning to Brescia as their head coach for the 2017–18 Serie B season. He was replaced by Pasquale Marino on 12 October 2017, only a few weeks after the club's takeover by Massimo Cellino. On 16 January 2018, he returned to Brescia following Marino's firing. He was however sacked once again on 29 April, leaving Brescia in thirteenth place in the Serie B table.

On 10 July 2018, he was appointed manager of Virtus Entella. On his first season in charge, he guided Virtus Entella to immediate promotion to Serie B as Serie C/A champions.

On 18 August 2020, Boscaglia was appointed manager of Palermo. He was sacked on 27 February 2021 following a 0–1 loss to Viterbese that left the Rosanero in mid-table zone, well below the top league spots.

In June 2022, after almost a year and a half of inactivity, Boscaglia was unveiled as the new head coach of Serie C club Foggia. On 27 September 2022, he left Foggia by mutual consent following a dismal start of the season, with only four points gained in the first five league games.

Managerial statistics

References

1968 births
Living people
People from Gela
Italian footballers
Italian football managers
Brescia Calcio managers
Association football midfielders
Footballers from Sicily
Virtus Entella managers
Serie B managers
Palermo F.C. managers
Serie C managers
Trapani Calcio managers
Novara F.C. managers
Calcio Foggia 1920 managers
Sportspeople from the Province of Caltanissetta